Boknesstrand (or Boknes) is a small seaside town in the Eastern Cape of South Africa. It is close to Cannon Rocks, Kenton-on-Sea, Alexandria, Bushman's River Mouth and Port Alfred. It is part of the Ndlambe Local Municipality in the Sarah Baartman District of the Eastern Cape.

Village 19 km south-east of Alexandria, at the mouth of the Boknes River, from which it takes its name. Formerly called Jammerfontein. The name Boknes is derived from Khoekhoen and means ‘father’s river’. The forms Bocna, Bokana etc. are also encountered.

References

External links
 

Populated places in the Ndlambe Local Municipality
Populated coastal places in South Africa